HEC Paris is a business school, and one of the most prestigious and selective grandes écoles, located in Jouy-en-Josas, France. HEC offers Master in Management, MSc International Finance, MBA and EMBA programs, specialised MSc's, PhD's and executive education.

HEC Paris is the founding member of CEMS - Global Alliance in Management Education and holds the triple accreditation (AACSB, AMBA, EQUIS).

History

Founded in 1881 by the Paris Chamber of Commerce (CCIP) with 57 students in the very first class, the École des hautes études commerciales de Paris (HEC) aimed to be in the fields of management and commerce what Centrale Paris was in the field of engineering.

In 1921, the school introduced the case-based method of the Harvard Business School, but most of the lectures remained theoretical. In 1938, the HEC program was lengthened to 3 years.

Due to French corporations' demand for North American style management education, at the end of the 1950s, the case-based method was generalized and a one-year classe préparatoire was created to prepare for the entrance examination, which had become more difficult. Evidence of the diploma recognition is that only 9% of HEC students also attended university in 1959, whereas 47% had done so in 1929.

In 1964, French President Charles de Gaulle inaugurated a new  wooded campus in Jouy-en-Josas. In 1967, HEC launched its executive education programs. Women have been accepted at HEC since 1973. Only 27 women were accepted that year and HEC jeunes filles (HECJF), another school dedicated to women, was closed. Its alumnae are officially considered graduates of HEC. HECJF alumni include, for example, Édith Cresson, the first woman to hold the office of Prime Minister of France.

In 1988, HEC founded the CEMS network with ESADE, the Bocconi University and the Cologne University.

In 2016, the school adopted a new legal status and became a public-private partnership (École consulaire or EESC) largely financed by the public Chambers of Commerce in Paris.

In 2017, HEC launched a portfolio of new dual degree programs called M2M with Yale School of Management, Hong Kong University of Science and Technology, and Fundação Getulio Vargas.

Grande École System 

HEC Paris is a Grande école, a French institution of higher education that is separate from, but parallel and connected to the main framework of the French public university system. Similar to the Ivy League in the United States, Russel Group in the UK, and C9 League in China, Grandes Écoles are elite academic institutions that admit students through an extremely competitive process. Alums go on to occupy elite positions within government, administration, and corporate firms in France.

Although they are more expensive than public universities in France, Grandes Écoles typically have much smaller class sizes and student bodies, and many of their programs are taught in English. International internships, study abroad opportunities, and close ties with the government and the corporate world are hallmarks of the Grandes Écoles. Many of the top-ranked business schools in Europe are members of the Conférence des Grandes Écoles (CGE), as is HEC Paris, and out of the 250 business schools in France, only 39 are CGE members.

Degrees from HEC Paris are accredited by the Conférence des Grandes Écoles and awarded by the Ministry of National Education (France)(). HEC Paris is further accredited by the elite international business school accrediting organizations and it holds the much coveted Triple accreditation: The European Foundation for Management Development (EQUIS), The Association to Advance Collegiate Schools of Business (AACSB), and Association of MBAs (AMBA)

International rankings

Programs

Higher education business degrees in France are organized into three levels thus facilitating international mobility: the Licence/Bachelor's, Master's, and Doctorate degrees. A Bachelor's degree requires the completion of 180 ECTS credits (bac+3); a Master's, requires an additional 120 ECTS credits (bac+5). HEC Paris does not offer a bachelor's degree; its highly coveted PGE (Program Grand École) ends with the awarding of Master's in Management (M.M.) degree. Outside of the PGE, students at HEC can be awarded other Masters degrees, such as the MBA (bac + 5), or a PhD (bac + 8).

Grande école Master in Management (MIM) 
French students who attended a classe préparatoire are taught fundamental managerial sciences during their first year at HEC.  Courses include economics, accounting, finance, law, psychology, sociology and mathematics (models, operations research, and statistics). During this first year, students can spend a semester in a foreign university (e.g. Wharton, Bocconi University, Trinity College Dublin, University of British Columbia, etc.). They can also enrol in a specific one-year program to get a bachelor's degree from a French university (see below).

Direct admissions, including international students, enter directly into the second year, where they begin a business-intensive program. Courses include corporate and market finance, accounting, marketing, law, mathematics, management, human resources, and supply chain. Second-year students are also allowed to spend one semester in a foreign university.  At the end of their second year, students choose specific majors and must pass through a less competitive application process.

To graduate, students are required to have 8 months of internships. Since this is usually difficult during the summer, many students take a semester or year off for their internship, generally between the second and third years. The final year of study covers intensive courses in the chosen major.

HEC Paris has numerous double-degree agreements with French and foreign institutions, including Sorbonne Universite, Sciences Po Paris, ENS Paris, and Ecole Polytechnique in France, and Yale University and HKUST abroad. Some of them only make degrees of the partner institution available to HEC students, while others also enable selected students of the partner institution to graduate from HEC.

MSc in International Finance (MIF) 
The MSc in International Finance is ranked #1 worldwide for pre-experience programs (2020 FT Rankings). This program caters to high-achieving graduates looking to succeed in a career in finance. Substantial contact time with world-renowned practitioners adds a new dimension to the traditional curriculum and provides students with an edge in an increasingly competitive environment. The first semester is dedicated to Core and Advanced Core courses, whereas the second semester allows students to choose from a concentration of electives as well as a wide variety of free electives.

The program puts a strong emphasis on graduate placement. It provides a variety of workshops and events with banks and multinational companies, including a study trip in London, designed to increase networking and job opportunities.

The program has a 99% placement rate within 3 months after graduation, where 68% of students work outside of their home country, and have an average salary of €66,000.

Students have the choice between (1) the Business track: designed for students with a background in business, finance or accounting; or (2) the Accelerated track: designed for students with a background in a quantitative field such as mathematics, engineering, physics, and econometrics.

Business track and accelerated track students have access to the same pool of electives in the Spring term and have the same career opportunities at the end of the program. In particular, they both have access to either a specialization in Corporate Finance or a specialization in Capital Markets (Spring term).

According to their choice, students will have access to a specific range of core and elective courses. While the first semester is dedicated to core and advanced core courses, the second semester allows students to choose from a concentration of electives as well as a wide variety of free electives.

12-18 month MSc / MS Programs
MSc Consulting and Coaching for Change (with Oxford University)
MSc Innovation and Entrepreneurship (delivered, in part, via Coursera)
MSc International Finance
MS/LL.M International Law and Management
MSc Managerial and Financial Economics
MSc/MS Marketing
MSc/MS Media Art and Creation 
MSc Strategic Management
MSc Sustainability and Social Innovation
MSc X-HEC Data Science for Business (with École Polytechnique)
MSc X-HEC Entrepreneurs (with École Polytechnique)

Master in Business Administration (MBA) 
The MBA program, created in 1969, has two intakes: September and January. HEC's MBA consists of a 16-month-long curriculum, with 8 months of core courses and 8 months of a customized program, including several specialization options, exchange programs, and fieldwork projects. A typical class is composed of some 250 students – 90% of whom are international students – with more than 52 nationalities represented in the 2017 graduating class. The selection process seeks a balance between academic achievement, professional experience, international exposure, and personal motivation. Knowledge of French is not an entry requirement, but participants are highly encouraged to have a basic knowledge of French by the start of the MBA Program, while mandatory (during the first two core terms) and optional language courses are offered throughout the program. Exchange and dual degree programs are offered with about 40 international partner business schools, including HKUST, London Business School, Columbia Business School, Wharton, and Yale.

Executive education

Executive MBA 
The HEC Executive MBA is a program for top executives with a minimum of 8 years of corporate experience, which prepares them for general management positions (the average background experience of students is about 14 years). The Executive MBA is a multi-site program offered in Paris (France), Beijing (China), St Petersburg (Russia) and Doha (Qatar). The courses are split between theory, case studies, strategic projects, leadership training, EU community campus and foreign exchanges in the US and Asia. Program partnering universities are NYU, UCLA, Babson College in the US, Tsinghua University in China and Nihon University in Japan.

TRIUM Global Executive MBA 
HEC also offers the TRIUM Global Executive MBA programme jointly with Stern School of Business of NYU and the London School of Economics. It is divided into six modules that are held in five international business locations over 16 months.

PhD Program 
The HEC Paris PhD in Management provides training for careers in research and academia. It offers 7 specialisations and usually takes 4–5 years to complete. The specialisations offered are Accounting & Management Control, Economics & Decision Sciences, Finance, Information Systems & Operations Management, Management & Human Resources, Marketing, and Strategy & Business Policy. As of December 2020, there are 59 students in the program, representing 18 nationalities. More than 90% of the students join an academic career upon completion. All PhD students receive a full tuition waiver, a five-year cost-of-living scholarship and research support funding.

Admissions 
HEC Paris is among the most selective French grandes écoles. The number of applications has steadily increased over the years.

Research and Entrepreneurship 

HEC Paris has several centres of research:
HI! PARIS CENTER - A collaboration with the Institut Polytechnique de Paris (IP Paris), this interdisciplinary and inter-institutional centre combines education, research and innovation to investigate the major challenges surrounding digital transformation and its impact on companies and society at large. This Center combines the 300 researchers and infrastructures of IP Paris and HEC Paris.
Society & Organizations Institute - an interdisciplinary Institute that brings together over 60 professors to research, teach and implement ideas in sustainability and inclusion.
GREGHEC - The Groupement de Recherche et d’Etudes en Gestion à HEC Paris is a joint research laboratory focused on economics and management in France.
Innovation & Entrepreneurship Center - 20 partnerships of excellence; 400 projects supported each year; an ecosystem of 400 professors, researchers and recognized experts.

The school has been offering a degree in entrepreneurship for more than 40 years, by creating HEC Entrepreneurs in 1977, which has today become the MSc X-HEC Entrepreneurs, in partnership with École Polytechnique. Since the creation of HEC Entrepreneurs, HEC alumni have created more than 600 companies. Between 2004 and 2013, the percentage of entrepreneurs per class jumped from 10% to 25%. In 2007, HEC Paris created Incubateur HEC Paris, its startup incubator dedicated to supporting alumni-created startups. Currently directed by Antoine Leprêtre, the incubator has been part of the Station F campus since 2017.

Student life

Campuses

France

HEC is located on a 110-hectare woodland campus in Jouy-en-Josas, 16  km. (10 miles) southwest of central Paris, close to Versailles. Jouy-en-Josas is served by the RER Parisian suburban train and the local bus service. The campus is built around a 19th-century château, which is currently used for Executive Education classes.

Lodging is provided in one of ten dormitories (Bâtiments) providing basic but furnished rooms. Everyone eats together at the University Restaurant, which serves two meals a day in a soup kitchen set. Grande école and Specialized Master students have classes in the Bâtiment des études (Batzet), while MBA students study in a specially designated building. There are three on-campus bars: Le Zinc, which is located on the second floor of the former Cafeteria (or Kfet), Le Wunder Bar, which is located on the first floor next to the Kfet, and the Piano Bar, which is adjacent to the MBA residence hall. The campus also has several sports fields, gym facilities and two lakes.

Qatar
HEC Paris in Qatar is a remote campus of HEC Paris, located in Doha, the capital of Qatar.
HEC Paris in Qatar is the result of an agreement between HEC Paris and the Qatar Foundation, a non-profit organization created in 1995 by the Emir of Qatar Sheikh Hamad bin Khalifa Al Thani and his wife, the Sheikha Moza bint Nasser.

HEC Paris in Qatar campus is located in the “Tornado Tower” in the heart of the “West Bay” financial centre of the city of Doha.
HEC Qatar offers four types of programs, including an Executive MBA and a Mastère spécialisé program.

Clubs
There are around 130 clubs or "associations" on campus.

The HEC Student Council (Bureau des Élèves in French, or BDE) is in charge of the social entertainment on campus. It is also in charge of coordinating all club activities and representing the students in front of the campus administration. The BDE organizes weekly events such as POWs ("Parties of the Week"), lunches and dinners, speakers, and sports events. HEC parties, which usually are organised every Thursday, are some of the most recognized ones among all French schools and universities. The BDE is composed of a 40-student team that is elected each year in April and for which the competition among students creates the well-known Student Office Campaign.

The HEC MBA Council is in charge of all social activities related to the MBA student body. It manages the MBA students' Piano Bar in the Expansiel Building (Building A), coordinates and sometimes funds all MBA club activities (speaker events, sports events, dinners, etc.), works to expand the HEC MBA brand, develops campus and alumni relations, sets up the new MBA students' integration week, and generally relays student concerns and needs to the administration. Elections for the MBA Council are bi-annual to accommodate both January and September MBA intakes.

Alumni association

The school alumni association, Association des diplômés HEC Paris, was founded in 1883 and gathers alumni of the different institutions of the HEC Group: École HEC Paris, MBA HEC Paris, HEC Paris Executive MBA, Mastères HEC Paris and Doctorat HEC Paris. Each degree is associated with a letter and the year of graduation. In 2017, HEC Alumni were ranked by The Economist as the 2nd most powerful business school alumni network in the world.

In popular culture
The institution is featured in many works. Association of Wrongdoers, a 1987 film by Claude Zidi, features former students.

See also
 List of HEC Paris people
 Education in France
 Grandes écoles
 CEMS

Notes and references

 Business schools in France
ParisTech
 Universities in Île-de-France
 Educational institutions established in 1881
1881 establishments in France